Osteopetrosis-associated transmembrane protein 1 is a protein that in humans is encoded by the OSTM1 gene. It is required for osteoclast and melanocyte maturation and function.

Function 

This gene encodes a protein that may be involved in the degradation of G proteins via the ubiquitin-dependent proteasome pathway. The encoded protein binds to members of subfamily A of the regulator of the G-protein signaling (RGS) family through an N-terminal leucine-rich region. This protein also has a central RING finger-like domain and E3 ubiquitin ligase activity. This protein is highly conserved from flies to humans. Defects in this gene may cause the autosomal recessive, infantile malignant form of osteopetrosis. This is also known as autosomal recessive Albers-Schonberg disease.

The OSTM1 gene is regulated by the Microphthalmia-associated transcription factor.

Interactions 

OSTM1 has been shown to interact with RGS19.

References

Further reading 

 
 
 
 
 

Protein families